Soyuz T-7 (code name Dnieper) was the third Soviet space mission to the Salyut 7 space station.  Crew member Svetlana Savitskaya was the first woman in space in almost twenty years, since Valentina Tereshkova who flew in 1963 on Vostok 6.

Savitskaya was given the orbital module of Soyuz T-7 for privacy. The Soyuz T-7 crew delivered experiments and mail from home to the Elbrus crew. On August 21 the five cosmonauts traded seat liners between the Soyuz Ts. The Dnieper undocked in Soyuz T-5, leaving the newer Soyuz T-7 spacecraft for the long-duration crew.

Crew

Backup crew

Mission highlights

Soyuz T-7 was an early flight to Salyut 7, the Soviet successor to Salyut 6.  The crew which launched on Soyuz T-7 remained aboard the station for eight days, as a short-term "visiting crew", accompanying the station's long-term resident crew.  The crew exchanged Soyuz vehicles with the resident crew, returning home in the older Soyuz T-5, leaving the fresher Soyuz T-7 available to the resident crew as a return vehicle.  This practice had been used several times on Salyut 6.

Savitskaya became the second woman in space, and the first to visit a space station.

Mission parameters
 Mass: 6,850 kg
 Perigee: 289 km
 Apogee: 299 km
 Inclination: 51.6°
 Period: 90.3 minutes

Gallery

See also

 1982 in spaceflight

References

Crewed Soyuz missions
Spacecraft launched in 1982
1982 in the Soviet Union
Svetlana Savitskaya